John William Buckner (September 12, 1947May 28, 2015) was an American educator and politician who served in the Colorado House of Representatives from the 40th district from 2013 to 2015, as a member of the Democratic Party. He was the first black person to represent the 40th district in the state house.

Early life and education

John William Buckner was born in Indianapolis, Indiana, on September 12, 1947, to Robert G. Buckner Jr. and Rachel D. Hardrick. He graduated from Shortridge High School in 1965. He graduated from Ball State University with a Bachelor of Arts in education in 1969. Buckner met his wife Janet Buckner, with whom he had three children, at Ball State University and married her on August 16, 1969.

The couple moved to Elgin, Illinois. Buckner sthen worked in the Cherry Creek School District for thirty-three years. In 1975, he became an assistant principal at Laredo Middle School and later worked as assistant principal at Smoky Hill High School and Prairie Middle School. From 1988 to 2005, he worked as the principal at Overland High School.

Career

Buckner was elected to the Colorado House of Representatives after defeating incumbent Republican Representative Cindy Acree in the 2012 election. Acree had been redrawn into a more Democratic district after having easily won in the 2008 election and facing no Democratic opponent in the 2010 election. He won reelection after defeating Republican nominee Julie Marie A. Shepherd and Libertarian nominee Geoff Hierholz.

He was the first black person to represent the 40th district in the state house and served as vice-chair of the Black Caucus. Buckner also served as the chair of the Education committee.

Death and legacy

Bucker took a leave of absence from the Colorado General Assembly in April 2015 due to health concerns. He died on May 28, from sarcoidosis in Aurora, Colorado. His name was added to the Emily Maureen Ellen Keyes and John W. Buckner Organ and Tissue Donation Awareness Fund permanently by the state house. Buckner's wife was selected unanimously by a vacancy committee of Arapahoe County House Democrats on June 25, to fill his seat and took office on July 15. Janet was reelected to the state house in 2016 and 2018, and later became the Speaker pro tempore.

Electoral history

References

External links
Official page at the Colorado General Assembly
Campaign site
 Biography at Ballotpedia
 Financial information (state office) at the National Institute for Money in State Politics

1947 births
2015 deaths
African-American state legislators in Colorado
Educators from Colorado
Educators from Indiana
Democratic Party members of the Colorado House of Representatives
Ball State University alumni
People from Aurora, Colorado
Politicians from Indianapolis
20th-century African-American people
21st-century African-American politicians
21st-century American politicians
Spouses of Colorado politicians